The 2017–18 season was Guadalajara's first competitive season and first season in the Liga MX Femenil, the top flight of Mexican women's football.

Guadalajara won the inaugural Liga MX Femenil tournament, defeating Pachuca in the Apertura 2017 final.

For the Clausura 2018 tournament, the team finished fourth overall, but failed to qualify for the playoffs.

Squad

Apertura

Clausura

Transfers

Out

Coaching staff

Competitions

Overview

Torneo Apertura

League table

Matches

Playoffs

Semifinals

Final

Torneo Clausura

League table

Matches

Statistics

Appearances and goals

|-

|-
! colspan=10 style=background:#dcdcdc | Players that left the club during the season
|-

|}

Goalscorers

Hat-tricks

Own goals

References

C.D. Guadalajara (women) seasons
Mexican football clubs 2017–18 season